West Warwick High School (abbreviated as WWHS) is a public high school in West Warwick, Rhode Island, United States. In 2022, the school ranked 29th out of 62 in Rhode Island by US News.

Academics
Below is a list of career opportunities at the school's Career and Technical Center (as of 2023):
 Academy of Finance
 Advertising Design
 Automotive Technology
 Aviation
 Children and the Elderly
 Cisco Academy
 Commercial Food Preparation
 Computer Technology
 Construction Trades
 Cosmetology
 Electronics/Computer Repair
 Electricity
 Engineering Graphics Technology
 Facilities Operation and Management
 Fashion Merchandising
 Health Occupation
 Machine Skills
 Marine Trades
 Travel and Tourism

Athletics
The school is a member of the Rhode Island Interscholastic League.

List of sports programs
West Warwick High School's sports teams play in divisions II and III and consist of both male, female, and co-ed teams alongside the teams' JV counterparts.

Boys sports
 Basketball – Plays in Division III, most recently finishing 18–7 in 2022–23 with an appearance in the quarterfinals. They have won six Division II championships in 1969, 1971, 1978, 1983, 1984, and most recently in 1994. They will be celebrating their 100th season in 2023–2024.
 Soccer – Plays in Division II, most recently finishing 1–12–2 in 2022. They have won one Division IV championship in 2004.
 Cross country
 Tennis – Plays in Division II. They have won one Division III championship in 2015, and they have also won one Division II championship in 2017.
 Volleyball – Plays in Division II, most recently finishing 10–9 in 2021.
 Indoor track – Most recently were 2017 Division II champions. They also won in 2016.
 Outdoor track – They have won three Division III championships, winning in 1999, 2016, and most recently in 2017.

Girls sports
 Soccer – Plays in Division II, most recently finishing 5–9–1 in 2022. They have won five Division III championships, winning in 1989, 2000, 2001, 2013, and most recently in 2014. They also have two Division II championships in 1990 and 1991.
 Basketball – Plays in Division II, most recently finishing 20–5 and Division II champions 2023 after finishing as runner-ups in 2022. They have won two Division II championship in 1989 and most recently in 2023. They have also won two Division I championships in 1991 and 1992.
 Softball – Plays in Division II, most recently finishing 12–7 in 2021. They were State champions in 1989 and 1992, they also won the Division II championship in 2003.
 Tennis – They most recently won the Division IV championship in 2005.
 Indoor track – They most recently won the Medium Class division in 2023.
 Outdoor track
 Cross country

Co-ed sports
 Football – Plays in Division III, most recently finishing 7–4 in 2022. They have won nineteen Division II championships in 1936, 1937, 1949, 1950, –, 1977, 1989, 1990, 1993, 2002, and most recently in 2013. They have won one Division I championship in 1983. Every year on Thanksgiving, West Warwick plays their rivals Coventry. West Warwick currently leads the series all time with 45 wins, Coventry has 12 wins, and the teams have tied twice. Coventry has won the last four match-ups, most recently winning 34–0.
 Baseball – Plays in Division II, most recently finishing 8–13 in 2021. They have won five Division II championships, winning in 1945, 1946, 1949, 2001, and most recently in 2002.
 Hockey – Plays in Division III, most recently finishing 9–9–1 in 2021.
 Golf – They have won ten golf championships. They were State champions in 1940, 1948, –, 1969, and most recently in 1970.
 Cheerleading – In 2015 they were Medium School champions. In 2016 and 2017 they were Large School champions. In 2019 and 2020 they have won the state championship and the Co-Ed Division championship. Also in 2019 they were New England Co-Ed champions. In 2021, the cheerleading team won the Division III championship, Co-Ed Division championship, Division II championship, and Fall State champions. In 2022, they won the Winter Co-Ed Division championship, Winter State championship, New England Co-Ed Division championship, Division II championship, and Fall State championship.
 Unified basketball – Play in the Central Division, most recently finishing 1–3 in 2021.
 Gymnastics – They have won three Division II championships in 2004, 2012, and most recently in 2019.
 Wrestling – They have won two Division III championships in 1992 and 1993.

Hazing allegations
On November 16, 2022, reports were released about hazing allegations regarding the West Warwick football team and the school itself, mainly having to due with the junior varsity players and team. The superintendent was notified of the alleged incident and suspended seven football players as a result on November 10. It was in question whether or not the team would be able to play in their next, and final, football game. The school had hired a private investigator. The current head coach of the team has been connected to the North Smithfield High School's hazing allegations as well, as he was previously the head coach for the team prior to the reports being released. A closed-door parent meeting held on November 17, 2022, proved to not be beneficial as parents were left with more questions than answers. The annual Thanksgiving day game against the Coventry Oakers was played despite ongoing investigations being conducted on both teams. The game resulted in a 34–0 win for the Oakers. As of January 2023, no formal charges have been pressed and all parties involved have returned to school.

Matthew Dennison
 
On February 13, 2022, a drunk driver hit Matthew Dennison, a senior, and another student, leaving Dennison in critical condition. The man was arrested and charged with DUI following the crash. On March 10, 2022, after spending 27 days in a coma, Dennison passed away at seventeen years old. On March 17, 2022, his funeral services were held and attended by West Warwick High School students and staff along with Dennison's former teammates on Exeter/West Greenwich hockey team. The Boston Bruins honored Dennison during one of their games shortly after his passing. After a few months, a memorial was approved to be erected in the honor of the 17-year-old hockey captain. On December 10, 2022, Matthew Dennison's number 16 jersey was retired during the West Warwick/Exeter/West Greenwich hockey team's game against Cranston High School West.

Clubs and activities
Below is a list of all clubs and extra curricular activities (as of 2023):
 Broadcasting Club
 Chess Club
 Chorus
 Concert Band
 Wind ensemble
 Drama Club (see below)
 French Club
 Gay/Straight Alliance (GSA)
 Interscholastic League Sports (see above)
 Italian Club
 Jazz Band
 Leadership Circle
 Magic Club
 Magic Word (student newspaper)
 Math Club
 Mock Trial
 National Honor Society
 Rhode Island Honor Society
 SADD/DARE Role Models
 Ski Trip
 Spanish Club
 STEM Club
 Student Council
 Tri-M Music Honor Society
 VASSA
 Visual Arts Honor Society
 World Language Honor Society
 Yearbook Committee (West Warwick Chronicle)

Performing arts
The performing arts, have helped to bring national status to the school in recent years. The West Warwick High School Jazz Ensemble "A" Band has won numerous awards including placing in the Finals of the Berklee College of Music High School Jazz Festival in 2002 to 2007, 2009, and 2012 to 2014; winning the prestigious festival in 2007 and 2014. The Concert Band and Concert Chorale have competed and won local and national awards and titles the past twenty years.

The West Warwick High School Players produce musical productions and have performed since 2009, performing High School Musical (2009), Footloose (2010), Aida (2011), Grease (2012), Legally Blonde (2013), In the Heights (2014),  Big Fish (2015), The Addams Family (2016), Catch Me If You Can (2017), Shrek The Musical (2018),  9 to 5 (2019), Chicago (2020), Songs for a New World (2021), SpongeBob SquarePants (2022), and Frozen (2023). In 2015, they were the first and only Rhode Island high school to participate in the Connecticut High School Theater Awards, the regional division of the National High School Musical Theater Awards (NHSMTA).

In 2022, West Warwick High School was chosen as the only school in Rhode Island to perform the play Frozen. It was chosen as the winner following a nationwide contest by the Disney Theatrical Group.

Notable alumni

 Tom Garrick – (class of 1984) Professional basketball player and coach

 Frank "Monk" Maznicki – (class of 1938) American football running back. The West Warwick High School football field is named in his honor
 Jim Mello – (class of 1938) American football fullback and linebacker
 Chuck Palumbo – (class of 1989) Professional wrestler and builder of custom motorcycles
 Mike Roarke – (class of 1948) Professional baseball catcher
 Adam Satchell – (class of 1999) American politician. He served as a teacher and a guidance counselor in the West Warwick school system prior to becoming the dean of students for West Warwick High School in 2022.
 Bob Wylie – (class of 1969) American football coach

References

External links
 

Buildings and structures in West Warwick, Rhode Island
Schools in Kent County, Rhode Island
Public high schools in Rhode Island
1905 establishments in Rhode Island